WE Model United Nations Expo (WEMUN Expo) was established in 2007 and was one of the first high-school Model United Nations conferences in China. It has become international with delegates from around 30 different countries and with over 1500 delegates, and has now grown to become the largest permanent Model UN conference in Asia. The conference takes place at the Grand Epoch City Hotel in the outskirts of Beijing annually at the beginning of August. The conference is unique as being the first MUN to unite eleven notable high-school level conferences — WEMUNC, Boston University's BeanMUN, the Ivy League Model UN Conference (ILMUNC), Model UN of University of Chicago (MUNUC), Berkeley Model UN (BMUN), North American Invitational Model United Nations (NAIMUN), The Hague International Model UN (THIMUN), Cornell Model UN Conference (CMUNC), Yale MUN (YMUN), McGill University's Secondary Schools' United Nations Symposium (SSUNS), and Oxford University's Oxford Global MUN

Harvard Model United Nations China 

WEMUN Expo has, since March 2010, collaborated with HMUN to bring a chapter of the Harvard Model UN Conference to China. The 2010 conference was held in Beijing and hosted 1000 delegates and 13 committees, and the 2011 conference was held in Shanghai.

See also 
 Model United Nations
 Harvard International Relations Council

References

External links 
 WEMUNC Official Page
 Harvard MUN China Official Page
 WEXPLORE China Official Page

Model United Nations
Chinese educational programs